Long intergenic non-protein coding RNA 1279 is a protein that in humans is encoded by the LINC01279 gene.

References